Teaneck, New Jersey was incorporated on February 19, 1895. It was created in Chapter 
XXVII in the Acts of the General Assembly of the State of New Jersey in 1895. The office of mayor did not initially exist as such.  In 1895, the township form of government was a direct democracy, with a three-member township committee handling the affairs of the township between annual town meetings. The township committee selected a chairman.  Historian Griffin wrote that William W. Bennett "was the obvious (and unanimous) choice to serve as Teaneck's first township committee chairman], roughly the equivalent of mayor and manager combined." New Jersey revised township organization in 1899, and in 1910 Teaneck moved to a five-man township committee.  On January 1, 1930, the Township selected its last chairman, Lacey Walker.  On November 11, 1930, the Township transferred to the Council-Manager form of Government, electing Karl D. Van Wagner to serve as the first Mayor (from among the five council-members) at the reorganization meeting. By 1946, Teaneck had both a mayor and a deputy mayor.  The first Deputy Mayor was Henry Diessler. There were twelve Chairmen prior to Karl Van Wagner being elected Mayor in 1930.  The 24 Mayors of Teaneck, New Jersey are as follows:

Mayors

References

 
Teaneck